Cynthia Phillips may refer to:
Cynthia A. Phillips, American computer scientist at Sandia National Laboratories
Cynthia B. Phillips (born 1973), American planetary scientist at the Jet Propulsion Laboratory and author of science popularization books
Cynthia Kieras Phillips (1954–2015), American plasma physicist at the Princeton Plasma Physics Laboratory
Cynthia Phillips, British Labour politician, candidate in 2022 City and County of Swansea Council election
Cynthia Phillips, actress in 1988 American comedy film Casual Sex?
Cynthia Phillips, American convicted murderer profiled in a 2020 episode of true crime television series Snapped
Cynthia Phillips, fictional character in American television drama Being Mary Jane